Nardos Sisay Chifra (born 18 January 1998) is an Ethiopian taekwondo practitioner. In 2015, she represented Ethiopia at the 2015 African Games held in Brazzaville, Republic of the Congo and she won the gold medal in the women's −46 kg event.

At the 2016 African Taekwondo Olympic Qualification Tournament held in Agadir, Morocco, she won one of the bronze medals in the women's −49 kg event.

In 2019, she represented Ethiopia at the 2019 African Games in the women's −49 kg event without winning a medal.

References

External links 
 

Living people
1998 births
Place of birth missing (living people)
Ethiopian female taekwondo practitioners
African Games medalists in taekwondo
African Games gold medalists for Ethiopia
Competitors at the 2015 African Games
Competitors at the 2019 African Games
21st-century Ethiopian women